Cherop or Jerop is a name of Kenyan origin meaning born during the rain. Notable people with the surname include:

Peninah Arusei Jerop (born 1979), Kenyan half marathon runner
Sharon Cherop (born 1984), Kenyan marathon runner

See also
Rop (name)
Kiprop

Kalenjin names